Rome is an unincorporated community in Daviess County, Kentucky, United States. It was also known as Clearys Grocery. Rome also has a Cemetery called Athey's Chapel Cemetery.  Rome is also referred to as a subdivision located on Highway 81 just southwest of Owensboro.

References

Unincorporated communities in Daviess County, Kentucky
Unincorporated communities in Kentucky